Spodotaenia basicornis is a species of beetle in the family Cerambycidae, and the only species in the genus Spodotaenia. It was described by Fairmaire in 1884.

References

Pachystolini
Beetles described in 1884